NGC 384 is an elliptical galaxy located in the constellation Pisces. It was discovered on November 4, 1850 by Bindon Stoney. It was described by Dreyer as "pretty faint, pretty small, southwestern of 2.", the other being NGC 385. Along with galaxies NGC 375, NGC 379, NGC 382, NGC 383, NGC 385, NGC 386, NGC 387 and NGC 388, NGC 384 forms a galaxy cluster called Arp 331.

References

External links
 

Elliptical galaxies
0384
18501104
Pisces (constellation)
003983